Body & Soul is the fourth studio album by English singer Rick Astley released in 1993. It was not commercially successful and became the first album released by Astley to miss the UK album chart. It did enter the Italian album chart at #28. Two singles were released to support the album, "Hopelessly" which charted in the UK at #33 followed by "The Ones You Love" which peaked at #48.

Following the release of this album, Astley took a hiatus from music for several years until the release of the 2001 single "Sleeping".

Track listing
 "Hopelessly" (Rick Astley, Rob Fisher) – 3:34
 "Waiting for the Bell to Ring" (Dave West, Rick Astley) – 4:53
 "The Ones You Love" (Rick Astley, Dave West) – 4:40
 "A Dream for Us" (Bruce Roberts, Rick Astley) – 6:07
 "Body and Soul" (Rick Astley) – 4:09
 "Enough Love" (Andy Morris, Ian Devaney, Lisa Stansfield, Rick Astley) – 4:07
 "Nature's Gift" (Andy Morris, Ian Devaney, Lisa Stansfield, Rick Astley) – 4:26
 "Remember the Days" (Rick Astley, Rob Fisher) – 3:57
 "Everytime" (Dave West, Gary Stevenson, Rick Astley) – 4:53
 "When You Love Someone" (Rick Astley) – 4:14
 "Stop Breaking Your Heart" – 4:13 (Japanese release only)

2010 re-issue
On 3 May 2010 an expanded edition of Body and Soul was released in a package together with Free, containing remastered and expanded editions of both albums across two discs.

Track listing
 "Hopelessly" – 3:34
 "Waiting for the Bell to Ring" – 4:53
 "The Ones You Love" – 4:40
 "A Dream for Us" – 6:07
 "Body and Soul" – 4:09
 "Enough Love" – 4:07
 "Nature's Gift" – 4:26
 "Remember the Days" – 3:57
 "Everytime" – 4:53
 "When You Love Someone" – 4:14
 "Stop Breaking Your Heart" – 4:15
 "The Ones You Love" (Single Edit) – 4:22
 "Hopelessly" (Live) – 3:50
 "Move Right Out" (Twelve-Inch Mix) – 6:35
 "Never Knew Love" (The 3 Day Mix) – 8:37
 "The Ones You Love" (Instrumental) – 4:51

Personnel

Musicians 
 Rick Astley – lead vocals, backing vocals (5, 6, 7, 9)
 Dave West – keyboards, drum programming, bass (1, 2, 3, 10), organ (10)
 Richard Cottle – electric piano (3), keyboards (4, 5, 8), Wurlitzer electric piano (4, 5, 8), synth bass (4, 5, 8)
 Jim Williams – classical guitar (3)
 Tony Patler – guitars (6, 7, 9), Moog bass (6, 7, 9)
 Felix Krish – bass guitar (8)
 Mark Brzezicki – live drums (1)
 Ian Thomas – percussion (2, 4, 6-9)
 Nigel Hitchcock – saxophone (2, 4, 6, 8), guitars (8)
 Derek Green – backing vocals (1, 2, 4, 6-10)
 Paul "T.J." Lee – backing vocals (1, 2, 4, 6-10)
 Beverley Skeete – backing vocals (1, 2)
 Gina Foster – backing vocals (10)

Production 
 Rick Astley – producer
 Gary Stevenson – producer, engineer
 Tom Lord-Alge – mixing
 Norman Moore – art direction, design
 Paul Cox – photography

Charts

References

1993 albums
Rick Astley albums
RCA Records albums